Lim Chi-Bin (born October 9, 1979), often anglicised  to Chi-Bin Lim, is a South Korean welterweight kickboxer fighting out of Khan Gym / Team Chi Bin in Seoul.  He is the three times Korea K-1 MAX champion currently competing in K-1 MAX.

Biography 
Chi Bin Lim made his K-1 debut at the K-1 World MAX 2005 Open in an elimination fight for a place at the K-1 World MAX Final against K-1 MAX legend Masato, whom he lost to by unanimous decision.  The next year Lim entered and won the K-1 Fighting Network KHAN 2006 in Busan event, defeating Su Hwan Lee in the final by technical knockout and qualifying for the K-1 World MAX 2006 Open.  As with the previous year Lim would be unable to progress to the final, losing to Takayuki Kohiruimaki via technical knockout.

Lim would return to tournament action at the K-1 Fighting Network KHAN 2007 in Seoul.  Due to the previous years win he would be the event favourite.  He managed to progress to the final but lost in a re-match of last years final by knockout to Su Hwan Lee.  This meant that he was unable to participate in the K-1 World MAX Final Elimination.  In 2008 Chi Bin Lim won the K-1 Asia MAX 2008 in Seoul Asia Tournament in devastating fashion, stopping all three of his opponents and earning himself a spot at the K-1 World MAX Final 16.  As with his previous attempts he was unable to make the final, losing to Yasuhiro Kido by knockout.

2009 would again see Lim enter and win his regional qualifying event - beating local rival Su Hwan Lee in the final and qualifying for the K-1 World MAX Final 16.  Once again Chi Bin Lim was unable to make the grade, losing a close decision to yet another Japanese fighter, Yuya Yamamoto.  Due to an injury he found his opportunities limited in 2010 and was not given an opportunity to qualify for the K-1 World MAX final .  He did have one highlight of that year, however, defeating Valdet Gashi in just 16 seconds at the 2010 W.A.K.O. PRO World Challenge.

He competed in the eight-man tournament at Glory 8: Tokyo - 2013 65kg Slam on May 3, 2013, losing to eventual champion Yuta Kubo via a second round body shot KO in the quarter-finals.

He lost to Mosab Amrani at Qabala Fight Series #1 in Qabala, Azerbaijan on June 29, 2014, suffering a knockdown with a knee to the body before being finished him a kick to the same spot shortly after.

He participated in the 2015 Glory Featherweight tournament. In the semifinals, he rematched Mosab Amrani. Amrani won the fight by a first round TKO.

He likewise took part in the 2016 Featherweight tournament. Lim lost by a second round TKO to Matt Embree in the semifinals.

Titles 
2009 K-1 Award & MAX Korea champion
2008 K-1 Asia MAX in Seoul Asia Tournament champion
2007 K-1 Fighting Network KHAN in Seoul runner up
2006 K-1 Fighting Network KHAN in Busan champion
2011 M-1 Welterweight champion
2011 W.A.K.O Pro Super Welterweight champion

Kickboxing record 

|-  style="background:#fbb;"
| 2016-09-09 || Loss ||align=left| Matt Embree || Glory 33: New Jersey - Featherweight Contender Tournament, Semi Finals || Trenton, New Jersey || TKO || 2 || 3:00 
|-  style="background:#fbb;"
| 2015-12-04 || Loss ||align=left| Mosab Amrani || Glory 26: Amsterdam - Featherweight Contender Tournament, Semi Finals || Amsterdam, Netherlands || TKO || 1 || 1:32 
|-  style="background:#fbb;"
| 2014-06-29 || Loss ||align=left| Mosab Amrani || Qabala Fight Series #1 || Qabala, Azerbaijan || KO (left body kick) || 1 || 1:28 
|-  style="background:#fbb;"
| 2013-05-03 || Loss ||align=left| Yuta Kubo || Glory 8: Tokyo - 65 kg Slam Tournament, Quarter Finals || Tokyo, Japan || KO (body shot) || 2 || 
|-  style="background:#cfc;"
| 2011-09-06 || Win ||align=left| Wesley Wein || 2011 W.A.K.O World Championship in Chun Ju Chiu Cheon|| Chun Ju, South Korea || KO || 1 || 2:00 
|-
! style=background:white colspan=9 |
|-  style="background:#cfc;"
| 2011-07-18 || Win ||align=left| Mosab Amrani || REBELS 8 & It's Showtime || Tokyo, Japan || Ext.R Decision (Unanimous) || 4 || 3:00 
|-
! style=background:white colspan=9 |
|-  style="background:#cfc;"
| 2011-04-24 || Win ||align=left| Daiki Watabe || REBELS 7 || Tokyo, Japan || Decision (Unanimous) || 3 || 3:00 
|-  style="background:#cfc;"
| 2010-10-03 || Win ||align=left| Hideaki Kikkawa || K-1 World MAX 2010 Final 16 - Part 2, Super Fight || Seoul, South Korea ||Decision (Unanimous) || 3 || 3:00 
|-  style="background:#cfc;"
| 2010-08-21 || Win ||align=left| Valdet Gashi || 2010 W.A.K.O. PRO World Challenge || Seoul, South Korea || KO || 1 || 0:16 
|-  style="background:#cfc;"
| 2009-09-26 || Win ||align=left| Tahir Menxhiqi || K-1 World Grand Prix 2009 in Seoul Final 16 || Seoul, South Korea || Decision (Unanimous) || 3 || 3:00 
|-  style="background:#cfc;"
| 2009-07-26 || Win ||align=left| Tatsuji || Rise 57 || Japan || Decision (Unanimous) || 3 || 3:00 
|-  style="background:#fbb;"
| 2009-04-21 || Loss ||align=left| Yuya Yamamoto || K-1 World MAX 2009 World Championship Tournament Final 16 || Fukuoka, Japan || Decision (Unanimous) || 3 || 3:00 
|-
! style=background:white colspan=9 |
|-  style="background:#cfc;"
| 2009-03-20 || Win ||align=left| Su Hwan Lee || K-1 Award & MAX Korea 2009 Final || Seoul, South Korea || KO || 3 || 1:50 
|-
! style=background:white colspan=9 |
|-  style="background:#cfc;"
| 2009-03-20 || Win ||align=left| Se Ki Kim || K-1 Award & MAX Korea 2009 Semi Final || Seoul, South Korea || KO || 1 || 1:30 
|-  style="background:#cfc;"
| 2009-03-20 || Win ||align=left| Min Sook Kwon || K-1 Award & MAX Korea 2009 Quarter Final || Seoul, South Korea || Decision (Unanimous) || 3 || 3:00 
|-  style="background:#fbb;"
| 2008-04-09 || Loss ||align=left| Yasuhiro Kido || K-1 World MAX 2008 World Championship Tournament Final 16 || Hiroshima, Japan || KO (Right Knee Strike) || 1 || 0:40 
|-
! style=background:white colspan=9 |
|-  style="background:#cfc;"
| 2008-02-24 || Win ||align=left| K.MAX || K-1 Asia MAX 2008 in Seoul Asia Tournament Final || Seoul, South Korea || KO (Left Hook) || 3 || 2:06 
|-
! style=background:white colspan=9 |
|-  style="background:#cfc;"
| 2008-02-24 || Win ||align=left| Doo Suk Oh || K-1 Asia MAX 2008 in Seoul Asia Tournament Semi Final || Seoul, South Korea || TKO (Referee Stoppage) || 2 || 0:33 
|-  style="background:#cfc;"
| 2008-02-24 || Win ||align=left| Satoru Suzuki || K-1 Asia MAX 2008 in Seoul Asia Tournament Quarter Final || Seoul, South Korea || TKO (Low Kick) || 3 || 0:38 
|-  style="background:#fbb;"
| 2007-07-21 || Loss ||align=left| Artur Kyshenko || K-1 Fighting Network KHAN 2007 || Seoul, South Korea || KO (Low Kicks) || 2 || 1:04 
|-  style="background:#fbb;"
| 2007-02-18 || Loss ||align=left| Su Hwan Lee || K-1 Fighting Network KHAN 2007 in Seoul Final || Seoul, South Korea || KO || 1 || 1:50 
|-
! style=background:white colspan=9 |
|-  style="background:#cfc;"
| 2007-02-18 || Win ||align=left| Yeon Jong Kim || K-1 Fighting Network KHAN 2007 in Seoul Semi Final || Seoul, South Korea || KO || 3 || 1:40 
|-  style="background:#cfc;"
| 2007-02-18 || Win ||align=left| Naoki Samukawa || K-1 Fighting Network KHAN 2007 in Seoul Quarter Final || Seoul, South Korea || Decision (Unanimous) || 3 || 3:00 
|-  style="background:#fbb;"
| 2006-09-16 || Loss ||align=left| Virgil Kalakoda || K-1 Fighting Network KHAN 2006 in Seoul || Seoul, South Korea || Ext.R Decision (Unanimous) || 4 || 3:00 
|-  style="background:#fbb;"
| 2006-05-05 || Loss ||align=left| Takayuki Kohiruimaki || K-1 World MAX 2006 World Tournament Open || Tokyo, Japan || TKO || 3 || 2:46 
|-
! style=background:white colspan=9 |
|-  style="background:#cfc;"
| 2006-02-25 || Win ||align=left| Su Hwan Lee || K-1 Fighting Network KHAN 2006 in Busan Final || Busan, South Korea || TKO || 3 || 1:30
|-
! style=background:white colspan=9 |
|-  style="background:#cfc;"
| 2006-02-25 || Win ||align=left| Sung Hwan Park || K-1 Fighting Network KHAN 2006 in Busan Semi Final || Busan, South Korea || Decision (Majority) || 3 || 3:00 
|-  style="background:#cfc;"
| 2006-02-25 || Win ||align=left| Jong Yoon Choi || K-1 Fighting Network KHAN 2006 in Busan Quarter Final || Busan, South Korea || Decision (Unanimous) || 3 || 3:00 
|-  style="background:#fbb;"
| 2005-11-05 || Loss ||align=left| Albert Kraus || K-1 Fighting Network Korea MAX 2005 || Seoul, South Korea || Decision (Unanimous) || 3 || 3:00 
|-  style="background:#fbb;"
| 2005-09-25 || Loss ||align=left| Hiroki Shishido || WSBA "Shoot Boxing 20th Anniversary Series 4th" || Tokyo, Japan || Decision (Unanimous) || 5 || 3:00 
|-  style="background:#cfc;"
| 2005-06-26 || Win ||align=left| Kenichi Ogata || WSBA "Shoot Boxing 20th Anniversary Series 3rd" || Tokyo, Japan || TKO (Doctor Stoppage, Cut) || 2 || 3:00
|-  style="background:#cfc;"
| 2005-06-04 || Win ||align=left| David Fernandez || KOMA(King Of Martial Arts) MS 'The Fame' || South Korea || KO || 1|| 0:10
|-  style="background:#fbb;"
| 2005-05-04 || Loss ||align=left| Masato || K-1 World MAX 2005 World Tournament Open || Tokyo, Japan || Decision (Unanimous) || 3 || 3:00 
|-
! style=background:white colspan=9 |
|-  style="background:#fbb;"
| 2004-10-13 || Loss ||align=left| Namsaknoi Yudthagarngamtorn || XENIA X-Fighter || Seoul, Korea || KO || 4 || 2:15
|-  bgcolor="#cfc"
| 2003-01-04|| Win|| align=left| Atsushi Otsuki || AJKF KICK ENERGY || Tokyo, Japan || KO (Corner Stoppage)|| 4 || 0:33
|-  bgcolor="#cfc"
| 2003-03-08|| Win|| align=left| Satoshi Kobayashi || AJKF Lightweight Tournament  || Tokyo, Japan || KO || 2 || 1:53
|-  style="background:#cfc;"
| 2002-12-01 || Win ||align=left| Yuya Yamamoto || 龍PROMOTION I.K.M.F. Korea - Japan 4VS4 Match|| South Korea ||Decision || 5 || 3:00
|-  bgcolor="#cfc"
| 2002-10-17|| Win|| align=left| Takahito Fujimasa || AJKF Brandnew Fight || Tokyo, Japan || KO || 2 || 0:25
|-
| colspan=9 | Legend:

See also
List of male kickboxers
List of K-1 events

References

External links
K-1.de - Your Source for Everything K-1 - Chi Bin Lim fighter's profile

Living people
People from South Chungcheong Province
People from Boryeong
1979 births
South Korean Muay Thai practitioners
South Korean male kickboxers
Lightweight kickboxers
Welterweight kickboxers
Sportspeople from Seoul
Sportspeople from South Chungcheong Province